Fit Brains is mobile/online software marketed for brain training.  Vivity Labs, which originally produced the games, was founded in 2008 in Vancouver, British Columbia by Michael Cole, a game developer, Paul Nussbaum, a neuropsychologist, and Mark Baxter, who had worked in the brain training field for the prior seven years. The platform was started mostly with private investors' money and was also supported by Telefilm Canada and National Research Council Industrial Research Assistance Program (NRC-IRAP).

Vivity was acquired by Rosetta Stone in 2013 for around $12 million; by 2016 Rosetta was looking for a buyer for the product.

Discontinuation 
As of June 7th, 2018 the software have been discontinued.

References 

Cognitive science organizations
Brain training programs